Night Court is an American television sitcom that aired on NBC from January 4, 1984, to May 31, 1992. The series is set in the night shift of a Manhattan Criminal Court presided over by a young, unorthodox judge, Harold "Harry" T. Stone (portrayed by Harry Anderson). The series was created by comedy writer Reinhold Weege, who had previously worked on Barney Miller in the 1970s and early 1980s.

Cast

Main
The judge
Harry Anderson, as Judge Harold "Harry" T. Stone, is a young, good-humored jurist and amateur magician whose parents are former patients of a mental health institution. He is 34 years old as of his swearing-in, making him the youngest serving judge at the time. The outgoing mayor had made appointments to fill a large number of judicial vacancies on his last day in office, a Sunday, and Harry was the only appointee of the entire group who was at home that day to answer a telephone call from the mayor's office and accept the position. He loves old movies, is vocal in his disdain for modern music (especially Barry Manilow), and idolizes actress Jean Harlow and crooner Mel Tormé, both of whose photographs he displays in his chambers.
The public defenders
Gail Strickland as public defender Sheila Gardner (pilot episode only).
Paula Kelly as Liz Williams (season 1).
Ellen Foley as Billie Young (season 2), a public defender and potential romantic interest for Stone during season 2.
Markie Post as Christine Sullivan (seasons 3–9): Her first appearance on the show was an early second-season episode ("Daddy for the Defense", originally aired October 4, 1984); she did not become a regular until the third season. (Post was a regular in a supporting role in The Fall Guy at the time.) Honest to a fault and somewhat naïve, she is the primary romantic interest for Stone and a regular target for Dan Fielding's lechery. She has various Princess Diana memorabilia collections such as a set of porcelain thimbles, as she is a huge fan of the British royal family.
The prosecutor
John Larroquette, as Reinhold Daniel Fielding Elmore, using the name Daniel R. "Dan" Fielding (although in the season 2 episode "Harry on Trial", he is referred to as Daniel K. Fielding), is a sex-obsessed narcissistic prosecutor, who would do almost anything to get a woman to sleep with him. It is hinted that he frequents dominatrixes. He is the source of many witty and sometimes cruel remarks about almost every other character, although he does have a compassionate side as well. When his homeless lackey Phil dies, the ever-greedy Dan is excited to discover that Phil is in fact wealthy and expects to be the beneficiary of his millions, only to learn that Phil's family will put Dan in charge of the Phil Foundation, tasked to give away Phil's entire fortune to worthy causes. Dan reveals near the end of the third-season episode number 22 "Hurricane (Part 2)" that his real first name is Reinhold (a reference to the show's writer and producer of the same name), and that he began using the name Dan out of embarrassment when he started school. The other characters are not aware of Dan's true name until the fifth-season episode "Dan, the Walking Time Bomb". It is discovered earlier in the series—second-season episode "Dan's Parents"—from Dan's parents Daddy-Bob (John McIntire) and Mucette (Jeanette Nolan), that he is using his middle name Fielding as a last name since he went to college because he believes it sounds better for a lawyer and because he is embarrassed by his impoverished childhood. He reveals in the episode "No Hard Feelings" that he received his law degree from the Bayou Institute of Law & Agriculture, whose mascot is the "Fighting Sow-belly." During the eighth season, he is revealed to have a successful younger sister named Donna, whose morals and life goals are similar to his own.
The bailiffs
Richard Moll, as Nostradamus "Bull" Shannon, is a seemingly dim-witted hulk of a figure, is actually patient, gentle, and childlike. Although he is portrayed as dull and unintelligent, he is actually a highly intelligent person with an IQ of 181. He is fiercely protective of Harry. Bull is known for his catchphrase, "Ooo-kay", and for clapping a hand loudly to his forehead when he realizes he had made a mistake. Moll had been filming a sci-fi movie (Metalstorm) and had shaved his head for the role. The producers loved the look and Moll kept his head shaven for the entire run of the series.
Selma Diamond, as Selma Hacker (seasons 1–2), is a chain-smoking (like the actress who played her) older bailiff. In one episode, she admits to having been with as many as six husbands, one of whom is a contortionist. Diamond died of cancer shortly after season 2, and the character's death is acknowledged on a subsequent episode.
Florence Halop, as Florence "Flo" Kleiner (née Nightingale) (season 3), is Selma's replacement. She is similar in age and personality to Selma, but loves motorcycles and heavy metal music. Halop died shortly after season 3, also of cancer like Diamond. In the opening episode of season 4, Harry Stone acknowledges that Florence Kleiner has died.
Marsha Warfield, as Rosalind "Roz" Russell (seasons 4–9), the third bailiff, a tall, tough, taciturn, no-nonsense woman. She usually projects a fearsome, standoffish image. Sharp-tongued, in time she becomes close to her coworkers. Warfield stays on the show for the rest of its run.
The court clerks
Karen Austin, as Lana Wagner (season 1), is the original romantic interest for Harry Stone, despite being engaged. Although Austin was asked to leave the show after 10 episodes, she was seen in the opening credits of all 13 first-season episodes.
Charles Robinson, as Macintosh "Mac" Robinson (seasons 2–9), is a Vietnam War veteran. He is easy-going and pragmatic, has a good sense of humor—frequently having the last laugh at Dan—and is a loyal friend to his coworkers. He always wears a cardigan, plaid shirt, and knit tie. By the end of the series, he leaves his job to pursue his dream of going to film school and becoming a director.

Supporting
Mike Finneran, as Art Fensterman, the bumbling maintenance man at the courthouse. His attempts to work on the courthouse often disrupt Harry's proceedings in the courtroom.
Martin Garner, as Bernie (seasons 1–3),  the operator of the concession stand in the cafeteria, who has a crush on Selma and often tries to persuade her to stop smoking. After Selma dies, he attempts to court Flo. 
Terry Kiser, as Al Craven (seasons 1–2),  an obnoxious tabloid reporter who sometimes hangs around the courtroom in hopes of discovering a scandalous story.
Jason Bernard, as Judge Willard (seasons 1–2), an arrogant, humorless judge who does not approve of Harry's antics and tries to have him removed from the bench.
Rita Taggart, as Carla Bouvier (seasons 1–2), more commonly known as "Carla B", a prostitute who frequently appears as a defendant and who has a crush on Harry.
Ron Ross, as Dirk, a wimpy bailiff.
Denice Kumagai, as Quon Le Duc Robinson (seasons 2–9), Mac's wife, a refugee from Vietnam, where she meets Mac during his service in the Vietnam War when her family lets Mac stay at their home while injured. Quon Le is naïve about America and its customs, but is loving and devoted to Mac. Mac originally marries her to keep her in the country, claiming he is not in love with her, but that quickly changes. She does not understand the concept of "buy now, pay later" but becomes more financially responsible after opening a restaurant in season 3. In season 4, moments after being sworn in as an American citizen, Quon Le gives birth to daughter Renee Flicka Robinson, who is named after Quon Le's favorite television show as a child, My Friend Flicka.
John Astin, as Buddy Ryan (seasons 3–9),  Harry's eccentric stepfather and a former patient in a psychiatric hospital. His catchphrase is the capper to stories involving his hospital stay or past strange behavior: "...but I'm feeling much better now," accompanied by a huge leering grin. He is later revealed to be Harry's biological father, admitting he has kept it a secret for fear that the truth would affect Harry's judicial carrer.
Mel Tormé, as himself, is almost fanatically admired by Judge Stone. The two periodically cross paths, but Tormé tends to become irritated with Harry due to the latter's unintended causation of misfortune. Tormé played Harry's guardian angel in a season 8 episode modeled after the film It's A Wonderful Life, where the angel shows Harry how his colleagues could have ended up had he never become a judge.
William Utay, as Phil Sanders, Dan's homeless lackey. Later in the series, Phil is killed in an accident involving a piano. Just before his death, Phil is revealed as actually extremely wealthy, but chose to live among the poor (a former stockbroker suffering from Howard Hughes syndrome). The show suggests the New York Harmonic Orchestra was known as the "PHILharmonic Orchestra" because Phil is one of its greatest patrons. Utay later played Phil's evil twin brother Will, who befriends Dan to steal all of the Phil Foundation's money. Will later returns what he had stolen along with additional cash from successful investing, and devoted the rest of his life to doing good deeds on Dan's behalf.
Brent Spiner and Annie O'Donnell as Bob and June Wheeler, a pair of down-on-their-luck stereotypical Appalachian yokels; although, they admit they are Yugoslavian, but they continue to speak the same way. Bob is a frequent defendant in Harry's courtroom, usually as the result of a series of freak disasters befalling his family. At one point, they run a concession stand in the courthouse, for which they spend the entire inheritance ($250,000), that "Granny" (oft-mentioned but never seen) had left them, forcing them to charge astronomical prices.
Leslie Bevis, as Sheila, an exotic nymphomaniac who often appeared to entice Dan into dangerous sexual liaisons during or after court to his detriment, causing him to go into a coma in one episode. 
Yakov Smirnoff, as Russian immigrant Yakov Korolenko. In the first season, Harry saves a distraught Yakov from a suicide attempt, and they became friends. Yakov eventually tries to bring his brother to America, succeeds in getting his wife Sonja and kids out of the Soviet Union, and gets his father to immigrate after the Cold War ended. Although Yakov's role was largely humorous, a few episodes were more serious, such as fighting the refusenik status of his wife and children, or where Yakov's father argues with Yakov about forgetting his roots.
Eugene Roche, as Jack Sullivan, Christine's overbearing father. He refers to Harry as "that nut".
Dan Frishman as Dan's boss, District Attorney Vincent Daniels. Though Dan initially underestimates him because he is a little person, he has an extremely tough personality and often has it in for Dan.
Bumper Robinson, as Leon, an orphan who becomes close to Harry. He first appears in season 2 as a shoeshine boy, who is always after Dan to pay for the shine. In season 3, he becomes Harry's temporary foster son before getting adoptive parents, whom he sees as geeks. Unsatisfied with the parents, he runs away after a confrontation with Harry, where he says that he wished Harry was his father from the start. He returns for one episode in season 4, in which Harry scares Leon into rejoining the foster program.
Ray Abruzzo, as Tony Giuliano, a police detective and Christine's fiancé, husband, and then ex-husband.
Mary Cadorette, as Margaret Turner, a newspaper reporter who became Harry's girlfriend/fiancée during season 8.  The couple broke up towards the end of the season due to Margaret being forced into the witness relocation program after testifying in court about a mob hit she had witnessed.
S. Marc Jordan, as Jack Griffin (seasons 8–9), the blind operator of the concession stand in the cafeteria.
Joleen Lutz, as Lisette Hocheiser (seasons 8–9), the ditzy court stenographer.
Gilbert Gottfried, as Oscar Brown (season 9), an attorney who filled in for Dan.
Florence Stanley, as Judge Margaret Wilbur, who occasionally filled in for Harry. She does not tolerate the staff's eccentricities. (Wilbur was a cross-over character from the NBC situation comedy, My Two Dads, where Bull Shannon had made guest appearances in two episodes.)

The only actors to appear consistently throughout the show's run were Anderson, Larroquette, and Moll.

Theme music
Every episode of Night Court opens and closes with a jazz-influenced, bass-heavy theme tune composed by Jack Elliott, featuring Ernie Watts on saxophone while featuring video footage of prominent New York City landmarks such as the Brooklyn Bridge and the New York County Courthouse.

Night Courts theme was used in the season-5 Family Guy episode "Bill & Peter's Bogus Journey", featuring animations of former US President Bill Clinton playing saxophone along with Secret Service musicians playing backup.

Night Courts theme was sampled for the remix to Cam'Ron's 1998 single "Horse & Carriage". It was produced by Darrell "Digga" Branch and featured Big Pun, Charli Baltimore, Wyclef Jean, and Silkk the Shocker.

Following the end credits theme music, a distinctive laugh can be heard dubbed over the vanity logo displaying producer Reinhold Weege's "Starry Night Productions". This same laugh can be heard coming from the studio audience throughout numerous seasons of Night Court. At first it was thought to be the canned laugh of voice actor Mel Blanc or even star Harry Anderson; but in fact, it was the laugh of Chuck Weege, Reinhold's father, who attended nearly all of the tapings in person.

Episodes

Awards and honors
Night Court received a number of awards and nominations. Both Selma Diamond (in 1985) and John Larroquette (in 1988) earned Golden Globe nominations, but lost to Faye Dunaway and Rutger Hauer, respectively. Paula Kelly was nominated for an Emmy after the first season. Larroquette won four consecutive Emmys for Outstanding Supporting Actor in a Comedy Series from 1985 to 1988, before he withdrew his name from the ballot in 1989. Selma Diamond was nominated in 1985, and Anderson received three nominations in 1985, 1986, and 1987. The series received three nominations for Outstanding Comedy Series in 1985, 1987, and 1988. The series also received many awards and nominations in the areas of lighting, editing, sound mixing, and technical direction. The show was nominated for 31 Emmys, winning seven.

Syndication

United States
After its primary run in broadcast syndication, the series aired on A&E Network for many years.  It then aired on TV Land from 2005 to 2008, then began airing on Encore Classic on December 2, 2013. From 2016 to 2021, the show aired on Laff.

Beginning in March 2023, the series will air on the Weigel Broadcasting owned Catchy Comedy network (formerly known as Decades) weeknights.

Australia
Network Ten first broadcast the series in the 1980s and 1990s. 7TWO began showing reruns in June 2011.

Canada
Aired weekdays on both Comedy Gold and JoyTV.

Germany
Sat.1 aired the series as Harry's wundersames Strafgericht (Harry's Miraculous Criminal Court) in 1988.

Italy
Italia 1 aired the show as Giudice di notte (Night Judge) from 1986 until 1988.

Spain
TVE aired the show as Juzgado de Guardia (Court on Duty/Call).

New Zealand
The show screened weekly on TVNZ 1 in the 1980s and 1990s, and was rerun in the late 1990s.

Home media
Warner Home Video released the first three seasons on DVD in Region 1.  Seasons 4–9 were released as Manufacture-on-Demand (MOD) DVDs as part of the Warner Archive Collection.

Special releases

The Television Favorites compilation DVD included the pilot episode, "All You Need Is Love"; both parts of the fourth-season finale, "Her Honor"; the fifth-season episodes "Death of a Bailiff" and "Who Was That Mashed Man?"; and the sixth-season episode "Fire", which marked the beginning of Harry's relationship with Christine.

Harry Anderson, Markie Post, and Charles Robinson appeared in the 30 Rock episode, "The One with the Cast of Night Court". John Larroquette is also mentioned; Harry says he had just spoken to John, which annoys Markie (who has not had recent contact with her absent former co-star) and begins an argument between them that lasts for most of the story.

Sequel series

In December 2020, NBC announced it was working on a sequel series to Night Court. The show will be executive produced by Melissa Rauch and Winston Rauch, with Dan Rubin to write. Larroquette is set to return as Fielding, while the show's central character will be Abby Stone, a judge and the daughter of Harry Stone. The show is expected to be produced by Warner Bros. Television for NBC. In April 2021, it was reported that Rauch will also lead the series as Abby Stone. In May 2021, it was announced that NBC had given a pilot order to a sequel series. In June 2021, Ana Villafañe joined the cast for the pilot, portraying an Assistant District Attorney and Lacretta will play a bailiff Donna "Gurgs" Gurganous. In July 2021, Kapil Talwalkar joined the cast for the pilot, will play a court's clerk Neil. In September 2021, it was announced that NBC had given the production a series order. In February 2023, it was announced that following the strong reception of the first four episodes, NBC had ordered a full second season of the show.

Notes

References

External links

1980s American legal television series
1980s American sitcoms
1980s American workplace comedy television series
1984 American television series debuts
1990s American legal television series
1990s American sitcoms
1990s American workplace comedy television series
1992 American television series endings
English-language television shows
NBC original programming
Primetime Emmy Award-winning television series
Television series by Warner Bros. Television Studios
Television shows set in Manhattan